The 1975 World Sambo Championships were held in Minsk, Belarus on September 6–11. It was the third World Sambo Championships.

Medal overview

Medals

Team ranking

References

World Sambo Championships
International sports competitions hosted by Belarus
Sport in Minsk
World Sambo Championships
20th century in Minsk
World Championships
World Sambo Championships